Matheus Silva may refer to:
Matheus Silva (footballer, born 1996), Brazilian football defender
Matheus Silva (footballer, born 1997), Brazilian football rightback
Matheus da Silva (born 2000), Brazilian football midfielder